The Korean Baduk League is a Go competition in South Korea. The league is made up of eight teams sponsored by several different companies. The tournament itself is sponsored by Baduk TV.

Past winners and runners-up

References

External links
 Official website (in Korean)
 Namu-wiki (in Korean)

Go competitions in South Korea